The Prophecy (known in Europe as Ween: The Prophecy) is a point-and-click adventure game in a fantasy setting, developed by Coktel Vision and MDO, released in Europe in 1992 for MS-DOS, Amiga, and Atari ST. It was published by Sierra On-Line in North America in 1993. A German retail version was released.

Gameplay and plot
The game takes place in the Kingdom of Blue Rocks, in which the player takes the role of a good wizard named Ween, who is tasked to take on the evil wizard Kraal. In three days' time, at the day of the Great Eclipse, Kraal plans to take over the kingdom. However, a prophecy states that, if three grains of sand are placed in the Revuss hourglass at the day of the eclipse by a brave hero, Kraal's doom would be sealed. To fulfill the prophecy in the limited time of three days, the player must go on three quests, solving various puzzles along the way to be rewarded three grains of sand that the player must place in the Revuss hourglass.

Objects around the levels are detected by the cursor. Generally the player have to solve each puzzle in sequence. Like in the company's Gobliiins series, the player character cannot die, although it is possible to fail on the last screen resulting in a game over. The game experiments with the toning of the graphics, using a faux-sepia style outside and some bright colours inside, which changes the atmosphere somewhat.

Critical reception
Quandrey gave it 80%, writing that they game might turn off some players due to its restrictive movement that only frees up once players have completed a particular puzzle. Metzomagic gave it 80%, praising its "complete lack of combat" as one of the appealing aspects of the "absorbing and challenging" adventure game". Ace Magazine felt the game's levels were varied and aesthetically pleasing. CU Amiga Magazine felt the puzzles were completely illogical.

Adventure Gamers gave it 40%, commenting that for players who don't particularly enjoy inventory puzzles, the game easily becomes "obscure, tedious, and, well… plain unenjoyable". Tap-Repeatedly/Four Fat Chicks gave a negative review, writing "considering the fact that I play games for fun and not only was The Prophecy not very fun, it was slightly disturbing on some subconscious, almost limbic, level, I'm going to have to recommend against it in the strongest possible terms: The cornpoop".

References

External links

1992 video games
Amiga games
Atari ST games
Coktel Vision games
DOS games
Fantasy video games
Point-and-click adventure games
ScummVM-supported games
Sierra Entertainment games
Video games developed in France